Kal (meaning "black" in Romani) is a world music Romani band from Serbia (originally from Valjevo, now based in Belgrade). They attracted Serbian and worldwide public interest with their eponymous debut album, released in 2006, presenting a blend of traditional Balkan Roma music with influences of Tango, Middle Eastern, Turkish, and even Jamaican influences.

Kal was formed in 1996, and they participated in several compilation album with other Roma, Serbian and world music performers. Their first national TV appearance was in a B92 show Timofejev in New Year's Eve 2006  , where they presented their unique style.

During 2006, Kal toured over a hundred concerts worldwide, including most of the European countries and United States. They participated in Sziget Festivals (in 2001, 2002, and 2004), La notte di San Lorenzo in Milano, and 11th European biennale of young artists in Athens, EXIT in Novi Sad in 2004 and 2005, and featured in 2006 World Music Expo, WOMEX. In April 2006, the album reached the first position of World Music Charts Europe and ended up 3rd in the annual list.

The band, particularly the frontman Dragan Ristić, are also politically and socially engaged, fighting the prejudices and Anti-Roma sentiment. Dragan and his brother Dušan founded the Amala Summer School in Serbia, a workshop of Romani language, history, culture heritage, and political power.

Lineup
 Dragan Ristić – Vocals, Guitar, 
Aleksandra Veljković-Vocals
 Milorad Šalajko Jevremovć – Vocals, Violin
 Rade Arsenović – Accordion
 Marko Ćurčić – Bass Guitar
 Dušan Gnjidić – Drums

Discography

Compilations
 Violeta & Kal: Budva '97 (1997, Komuna Belgrade)
 Balkan Ambience (1998, Marko's music, Bulgaria)
 World Rhythms (1998, United One Records, Germany)
 A zenne unnepe (2000, France Cultural Institute)
 Romano Suno (2003, B92 Records)
 Serbia Sounds Global 3 (2003, B92 Records)

Albums
 Kal (2006) (B92 /reissued internationally Asphalt Tango)
 Radio Romanista (2009) (B92 / Asphalt Tango)
 Romology (2013) ARC music (UK)City Records,Multimedia records Serbia),Lou rocked boys (Poland)

References

External links
  
 Kal at Amala Summer School web site
 Kal on Asphalt Tango, the international record label

Serbian Romani musical groups
World music groups
Musical groups established in 1996
Gypsy punk groups
Romani-language bands